Thorsten Johansson (9 October 1950 – 18 January 2021) was a Swedish sprinter. He competed in the men's 200 metres at the 1976 Summer Olympics.

References

External links
 

1950 births
2021 deaths
Athletes (track and field) at the 1976 Summer Olympics
Swedish male sprinters
Olympic athletes of Sweden
Universiade medalists in athletics (track and field)
Place of birth missing
Universiade bronze medalists for Sweden
Medalists at the 1975 Summer Universiade
20th-century Swedish people